Vexillum charlesi is a species of small sea snail, marine gastropod mollusk in the family Costellariidae, the ribbed miters.

Description
The length of the shell attains 16 mm.

Distribution
This marine species occurs off Japan and the Philippines.

References

 Turner, H.; Callomon, P. (2001). New Records of Mitriform Gastropods from Japan with Description of Vexillum(Pusia) charlesi n. sp. (Neogastropoda: Muricoidea: Costellariidae). Venus (Journal of the Malacological Society of Japan). 60 (1-2): 7-14

charlesi
Gastropods described in 2001